Route 117 is an East/West provincial highway in the Canadian province of New Brunswick. The road runs from Route 11 intersection in Saint-Louis. The road has a length of approximately 114 kilometres, and services small, otherwise isolated rural communities. In these areas, the highway is often unofficially referred to as "Main  Street."  The Road is called Loggie Road, Wellington Street, University Avenue, and Airport Road in the city of Miramichi. This Route Mainly follows the Gulf of St. Lawrence in New Brunswick.

History

Route 117 was created in 1965 from parts of the former Routes 12 (between Nelson and Chatham) and 37 (between Chatham and Bay du Vin).

The Chatham bypass and Miramichi Bridge were completed in 1997, creating a high-speed controlled-access connector between Newcastle and Chatham in the City of Miramichi.

Intersecting routes
North to East to South to West
Starts Merged with Route 8 at the Intersection of Route 126 and Water Street in Miramichi.
Unmerges with Route 8 at the Intersection of Route 11 in Miramichi
Route 134 in Kouchibouguac
Route 11 in Kouchibouguac

River crossings
 Bay du Vin River (Bay du Vin)
Little Branch Black River (Black River Bridge)
Black River (Black River Bridge)
Napan River (Napan)
Miramichi River (Miramichi) Miramichi Bridge

Communities along the Route
Saint-Louis, 
Kouchibouguac
Pointe-Sapin
Escuminac
Baie-Sainte-Anne
Hardwicke
Gardiner Point 
Bay du Vin
Miramichi Bay
Black River Bridge
Napan
Miramichi

See also
List of New Brunswick provincial highways

References

New Brunswick provincial highways
Roads in Northumberland County, New Brunswick
Roads in Kent County, New Brunswick